David Canfield may refer to:

 Dave Canfield, Canadian politician
 David DeBoor Canfield (born 1950), American composer